Hastain is an unincorporated community in Benton County, Missouri, United States.

A post office called Hastain was established in 1884, and remained in operation until 1951. The community was named after the local Hastain family.

References

Unincorporated communities in Benton County, Missouri
Unincorporated communities in Missouri